Afrikaner Self-determination Party (AFRSP) is a South African far-right political party formed in early 2020 as a successor to the Front National. The party promotes secession and Afrikaner self-determination.

See also 
 Afrikaner nationalism

References

External links
Front National of South Africa Facebook

2020 establishments in South Africa
Afrikaner nationalism
Afrikaner organizations
Boer nationalism
Conservative parties in South Africa
Far-right political parties
Nationalist parties in South Africa
Political parties established in 2020
Political parties in South Africa
Political parties of minorities
Pro-independence parties
Separatism in South Africa
White nationalist parties
Protestant political parties